

Season summary 
Following to Platini's leave, Juventus tried to find a substitute in Welsh striker Ian Rush. Despite being seasonal top scorer, he disappointed fans' hope about him. Bianconeri passed only a challenge in UEFA Cup, finishing their path in round of 32. Condemned by a slow trend in league Juventus bet his cards on domestic cup, but was defeated by Torino in semifinals. His revenge came anyway after Serie A end, beating granata (on shootout) in a playoff that awarded last UEFA Cup spot.

Squad

Goalkeepers
  Stefano Tacconi
  Luciano Bodini

Defenders
  Luigi De Agostini
  Sergio Brio
  Roberto Tricella
  Antonio Cabrini
  Pasquale Bruno
  Paolo Siroti
  Luciano Favero
  Franco Giordano
  Gaetano Scirea

Midfielders
  Michael Laudrup
  Massimo Bonini
  Massimo Mauro
  Marino Magrin
  Beniamino Vignola
  Mauro Conte
  Ivano Bonetti
  Patricio Kean

Attackers
  Angelo Alessio
  Ian Rush
  Renato Buso
  Andrea Caverzan
  Antonino Gambino

Competitions

Serie A

League table

Matches

UEFA Cup qualification

Juventus qualified for 1988–89 UEFA Cup.

UEFA Cup

First round

Second round

Coppa Italia 

First round

Eightfinals

Quarterfinals

Semifinals

References

Juventus F.C. seasons
Juventus